Puppet History is a game show YouTube series produced by Ryan Bergara, Steven Lim, and Shane Madej through their company, Watcher Entertainment. Bergara, Lim, and Madej met when they worked at BuzzFeed but later left to seek more artistic control. Bergara and Madej are best known from their series BuzzFeed Unsolved.

Puppet History began in January 2020. The show's premise sees a colorful puppet historian known as the Professor presenting a game show about one or two distinctive persons or events from history. The two contestants answer questions, and the Professor gives them points; the contestant with the most points wins the title of "History Master" and a small trophy.

Format

The show begins with the Professor, a blue puppet, greeting the guests from a puppet theater stage. The contestants are almost always Ryan Bergara and one other person. The Professor then tells a story about history. He stops every few minutes to ask the two guests questions, which are sometimes multiple choice; whoever answers correctly, or as close to correctly as possible, receives points (referred to as "jelly beans").

The scoring is relatively loose, and a contestant may be awarded more than one point, or just half a point, for their answer, as well as extra points being awarded as the Professor sees fit. The show presents parts of the story and answers to some questions through reenactments of scenes using paper cutouts of people from history. The prize is a small plastic trophy containing jelly beans or another small prize. The Professor refers to it as the "coveted cup and title of History Master" in his opening speech and at other times during the episode.

The Professor encourages the guests to tell jokes and is often more attentive towards the guests than to Bergara. Before the end of the show, the Professor leaves to "tally the score" using "our complex victory algorithm," and another puppet or puppets come onto the stage and sing a song about the historical event.

For the first four seasons, the Professor claims that the algorithm has awarded the cup and title of "History Master" to the guest contestants, regardless of who actually acquired more points. In season five, this trend was inverted, and Bergara won almost every episode (with the exception of episode six) regardless of his point total. However, due to a "supply chain issue" in sourcing the trophies, Bergara instead won a Puppet History-themed moisturizer every episode (except episode 5, when a "Yankee Dodge"-flavored vape was presented as prize). This is later revealed to be a plot by the Professor, actually an evil holographic doppelganger, to steal Bergara's flesh and use it as a body.

Characters
Each episode includes:
The Professor, a blue puppet voiced by Shane Madej,
Ryan Bergara, as himself,
A guest contestant, typically another YouTuber,
At least one other puppet, also voiced by Shane Madej.

Episodes

In season one, Bergara and the other contestant sat in chairs in the same room as the puppet theater. Due to the COVID-19 pandemic, seasons two and three were carried out virtually and the show was named Puppet History: Online University. In season 4, the show returned to being in person.

The Professor

The Professor is a small hand puppet with blue fur and a white nose. He usually wears a safari hat and jacket and carries a satchel. He wears glasses and a bow tie. Sometimes, he wears other costumes. For example, in the episode about Ching Shih, he wore a three-cornered pirate hat, and in the episode about the 1904 Summer Olympics he wears a women's gymnastics leotard.

The Professor sometimes talks about his life through wrong answers to the multiple-choice questions. These answers say the Professor found a magic lamp that had a magical genie inside it. He wished for the genie to turn a "seemingly ordinary household object", revealed to be the Professor's satchel, into a secret time machine. The genie did so, but was also "a total prick about it." In the flashbacks, the genie is also played by Shane Madej. In other episodes, the Professor mentions visiting the past and meeting people from history. Sometimes he talks about the genie chasing him through time, due to the effects from time-traveling bringing the various singing guest puppets to life. For example, in "The Great Molasses Flood," the Professor gets stuck in the molasses and the genie almost catches him.

In the last episode of Season 4, we see the Professor go back in time to the Cretaceous period. A T-rex eats him. Words on the screen tell the audience that the Professor is canonically dead. In the Puppet History Holiday Spectacular, many of the puppets seen earlier in the show acknowledge his death and sing a song in his honor.

Season 5 of Puppet History premiered on November 11, 2022 with an episode titled "How Hippo Meat Almost Saved America". The Professor is somehow alive, and the puppet theater is connected to a mysterious electronic box which he warns the guests not to touch or talk about. He is later revealed to be a hologram originally created by the cycloptic purple puppet version of God to deliver the Professor's eulogy, but elected by the puppets to host the show. The real Professor is revealed to have somehow revived, albeit much larger, and hatched from an egg laid by the same T-rex, who is married to some kind of pterosaur. As the holographic Professor reveals his plans of skinning Ryan and wearing his flesh and the two are involved in a hectic battle, Ryan rubs the genie lamp to bring the Professor and his new dinosaur parents from the Cretaceous period just as the meteor is about to strike, and kills the hologram by defenestration.

Notes

References

External links
Official YouTube channel

2020 web series debuts
2020s YouTube series